Ribonuclease UK114 is an enzyme that in humans is encoded by the HRSP12 gene.

References

Further reading

External links